The 2006 Aprilia RX/SX 50 is a street/off-road motorcycle widely produced by Aprilia. It is powered by a six-speed, carburetor-fuelled, nikasil-lined and cast iron single-cylinder two-stroke engine manufactured by Derbi/Piaggio.

Styling and concept 
The 2006 Aprilia RX/SX 50s are the renovated successors of the Aprilia RX 50 first produced in 1992; the panels and layout are based closely on the bigger displacement Aprilia RXV/SXVs.

Engine 
The engine in the Aprilia SX 50 is sourced from Derbi/Piaggio (D50B0/D50B1). This engine is used in the Derbi Senda DRD/X-Race/X-Treme supermotos and crossers, as well as the 2006 onwards Derbi GPR 50 and Aprilia RS 50 road bikes, although the road bikes feature an electric starter instead of a kickstarter on the supermotos. Engine parts from the crossers and supermotos can be directly swapped with one another; there are some small differences between the road bike and supermoto engine and frame which may require modification to transfer some external engine parts (exhaust, airbox etc.)

Specifications

SX50 
50 cc single cylinder, six-petal reed valve case induction and two-stroke injection (automix) carburetor fueled.
Engine displacement – 49.76 cc
Bore/stroke – 39,88×40 mm
Compression ratio – 11.5:1
Clutch – Wet, multiple plate
Starting – Kickstart
Exhaust = Catalytic converter
Rotor Ignition/Generator = 85w/120w
Cooling system – Liquid-cooled
Fuel tank size = 7 litres
Fuel system – Carburetor Dell'Orto PVHA 17.5 mm
Main jet = 95
Needle Jet = A13, notch #2
Idle jet = 30
Transmission
1st = 1st 11/34
2nd = 2nd 15/30
3rd = 3rd 18/27
4th = 4th 20/24
5th = 5th 22/23
6th = 6th 23/22
Primary drive = 21/78
Sprockets
Front = 14 Teeth
Rear = 53 Teeth
Overall Final Drive ratio = 14/53
Spark plug = DENSO W27ESR-U/IW27 NGK BR9ES/BR9EG/BR9EIX
Gap = .6-7 mm
Wheelbase = 
Length = 
Width = 
Height = 
Tires = Front: 100/80 - 17 inch; Rear: 130/70 - 17-inch

RX50 
50 cc single cylinder, six petal reed valve case induction and two-stroke injection (automix) carburetor fueled
Engine displacement = 49.76 cc
Bore/stroke = 39,88×40 mm
Compression ratio = 11.5:1
Clutch = Wet, multiple plate
Starting = Kickstart
Exhaust = Catalytic converter
Rotor Ignition/Generator = 85w/120w
Cooling System = Liquid-cooled
Fuel Tank Size = 7 litres
Fuel System = Carburetor Dell'Orto PVHA 17.5 mm
Main Jet = 95
Needle Jet = A13, notch #2
Idle Jet = 30
Transmission
1st = 1st 11/34
2nd = 2nd 15/30
3rd = 3rd 18/27
4th = 4th 20/24
5th = 5th 22/23
6th = 6th 23/22
Primary Drive = 21/78
Sprockets
Front = 14 Teeth
Rear = 53 Teeth
Overall Final Drive ratio = 14/53
Spark Plug = DENSO W27ESR-U/IW27 NGK BR9ES/BR9EG/BR9EIX
Gap = .6-7 mm
Wheelbase = 
Length = 
Width = 
Height = 
Tires = Front: 90/90 - 21 inch; Rear: 110/80 - 18-inch

Restriction 
Restriction varies depending on the country and sky, person, or company the bike is purchased from. The engine is usually restricted in the following ways:

Carburetor
'Strangle' baffle/plate in Air filter manifold
74 Main jet
Exhaust
Exhaust fume/pressure outlet pipes
Catalytic converter
Sprockets
Front; reduced to 11/53 or 12/53
Ignition system (only on models 2018 and after)
Limited to 8000 RPM

References 

 
 

RX SX 50